Satguru Brahm Sagar Ji Maharaj Bhuriwale (1862–1947) was an Indian religious figure. He was born in Rampur Dham in the Rupnagar district of Punjab and died in Village Jhaloor Dham Distt. Barnala.

Etymology
He was the founder of Shri Satguru Bhuriwale (Garib Dassi) sect. He was called by the name of "Bhuriwale" Maharaj because he used to wear a black colored shawl that is called as "Bhuri" in Punjab. It too has a Bhuri ko Bhukhar story behind it.

Background
Brahm Sagar Ji Bhuriwale was the follower of Acharya Garib Das Ji of Chhudani village of Jhajjar district in Haryana. Acharya Garib Das Ji preached the divine baani (message, literally voice) in the area that is now covered by the current states of Punjab, Himachal Pradesh and Haryana. He taught the rural people of Punjab to live a life of sacrament and honesty.

In the Bhuriwale Sampradaya, Sandhia Aarti is performed to Guru Garib Das Granth, he is worshipped by all his devotees every evening. Brahm Sagar Ji had a great devotion towards the birthplace of their Guru Acharya Garib Das, which is called Shri Chhudani Dham in Haryana.

Lal Das Ji was then appointed as successor of Brahm Sagar Ji Bhuriwale. Brahm Sagar Ji Bhuriwale called Lal Das Ji his Lal (son).

After Lal Das Ji's Joti Jot (demise), Brahma Nand Ji Bhuriwale (formerly known as Gauanwale) was appointed the next Guru. He too, along with his preaching, gifted the followers by opening schools and many degree colleges under the banner of his Gurus, especially for the girls in the rural areas like district Hoshiarpur district, Shaheed Bhagat Singh Nagar district, Ludhiana district, Ropar district.

A charitable trust named Maharaj Bhuriwale (Garibdassi) Education trust was registered in 1984.

Brahma Nand Ji was succeeded by the current Gaddi Nashin (spiritual leader) Guru, Chetna Nand Ji. Chetna Nand Ji is known as Vedhant Acharya Swami Chetna Nand Ji Bhuriwale among his followers. He is also known as "Kashiwale".

Construction of temple at Chhudani Dham by the Founder
A magnificent temple was made at Chhudani village in Jhajjar district of Haryana under the guidance of Shri Satguru Brahm Sagar Ji Maharaj Bhuriwale, where clothes and other vestments of Baba Garib Das Ji are displayed in open showcases for the Darshans of followers in Shri Chhudani Dham temple. The first Handwritten manuscript is placed and maintained by the present head of Garid Das's Bhuriwale sect, Mahant Dayasagar (Meharban Sahib).

See also
 Akhara
 Sampradaya

References

Bhuriwale Maharaj ji Official website
Maharaj Bhuriwale Jiwani Pustak,Published by MBG Trust

External links 
Bhuriwale.com 
Bhuriwale 
www.baanigaribdassji.org 

People from Haryana
Hindu activists
Bhakti movement
1947 deaths
1862 births